The Collegium of Justice (also College) was a Russian executive body (collegium), created in the government reform of 1717. It was de-established during the decentralising reforms of Catherine II of Russia. Its first President was Andrey Matveev.

References 
 
 
 

Collegia of the Russian Empire
1717 establishments in Russia